St Helens Airport  is a small Australian regional airport located  east of St Helens on the north-east coast of Tasmania.

The airport is commonly used to transport fresh seafood from the east coast to the Australian mainland. The airport also has a small flying school and scenic flights also operate out of the airport. The airport has one unsealed runway and a NDB beacon on 392 kHz.

See also
 List of airports in Tasmania

References

Airports in Tasmania
East Coast Tasmania